Cobalt poisoning is intoxication caused by excessive levels of cobalt in the body. Cobalt is an essential element for health in animals in minute amounts as a component of Vitamin B. A deficiency of cobalt, which is very rare, is also potentially lethal, leading to pernicious anemia.

Exposure to cobalt metal dust is most common in the fabrication of tungsten carbide. Another source is from wear and tear of certain metal-on-metal hip prostheses.

Per the International Agency for Research on Cancer (IARC), cobalt metal with tungsten carbide is "probably carcinogenic to humans" (IARC Group 2A Agent), whereas cobalt metal without tungsten carbide is "possibly carcinogenic to humans" (IARC Group 2B Agent).

Cobalt salts

The  value for soluble cobalt salts has been estimated to be between 150 and 500 mg/kg. Thus, for a 100 kg person the LD50 would be about 20 grams.

Soluble cobalt(II) salts are "possibly carcinogenic to humans" (IARC Group 2B Agents).

Beer drinker's cardiomyopathy 
In August 1965, a person presented to a hospital in Quebec City with symptoms suggestive of alcoholic cardiomyopathy. Over the next eight months, fifty more cases with similar findings appeared in the same area with twenty of these being fatal. It was noted that all were heavy drinkers who mostly drank beer and preferred the Dow brand; thirty out of those drank more than 6 litres (12 pints) of beer per day. Epidemiological studies found that Dow had been adding cobalt sulfate to the beer for foam stability since July 1965 and that the concentration added in the Quebec city brewery was ten times that of the same beer brewed in Montreal where there were no reported cases. A 1972 paper noted that several dozen cases were also identified over a similar time period in Omaha, Nebraska; Minneapolis, Minnesota; and Belgium.

Cobalt in the environment
Plants, animals, and humans can all be affected by high cobalt concentrations in the environment. For plants, the uptake and distribution of cobalt is entirely species-specific.  In some species of plants, the overaccumulation of cobalt can lead to an iron deficiency.  This in turn leads to poor growth of the plant as well as leaf loss which overall decreases the amount of oxygen produced by plants during photosynthesis.  Eventually the deficiency would lead to plant death. One such example was seen in an experiment involving the effects of increased cobalt concentration on tomato plants. As the dosage of cobalt in the soil surrounding the plants increased, so too did the rate of necrosis of the leaves of the tomato plant. Over time this led to an inability of the plant to produce fruit and eventually the plant died.

References

External links 

Cobalt
Toxic effects of metals